What on Earth Have I Done Wrong?! is a 2007 Taiwanese comedy film directed, co-written, and co-produced by Doze Niu, starring himself as struggling film director-producer "Doze Niu", in his feature film debut. Billed as "an honest outlook inside Doze Niu's life and Taiwan's entertainment industry", the low-budget mockumentary was shot mainly home movie-style with little background music. Most of the actors portrayed themselves (or at least satirized versions).

Cast
Doze Niu as Doze Niu, film director and owner of the film studio Honto Productions 
Janine Chang as Ningning, actress and Niu's live-in girlfriend
Ke Huan-ru as Huan-ru, actress and Ningning's best friend
Chang Ching-chin as Doze Niu's mother (Chang is Niu's real-life mother)
Tsai Hsin-hung as Hsin-hung (Tsai was also the executive producer of this film)
Megan Lin as Megan (Lin was also art director of this film)
Tsang Shu-pei as Pei (Tsang was also editor and production assistant of this film)
Lien Yi-chi as Lien (Lien was also production coordinator of this film)
Ke Yi-sen as Yi-sen (Ke was also script supervisor of this film)
Chen Hsi-sheng as Hsi-sheng 
Lee Ying-yi as Ying-yi
Wu Kuei-chun as Wu Kuei-chun, a.k.a. "Turtle", mob boss
Amy Lee as Amy Lee, therapist
Lin Yi-hao as President Tsai, rich guy
Ding Ning as Ding Ning, actress
Wang Li-jen as Wang Li-jen, actress
Chu Zhong-heng as Chu Zhong-heng, actor
Xiu Jie-kai as Xiu Jie-kai, actor
Chiu Yi as himself
Ella Chen (cameo)
Dee Shu (cameo)
Kevin Tsai (cameo)
Joe Cheng (cameo)
Luo Wen-jia (cameo)

Awards and nominations
2007 Golden Horse Film Festival and Awards
Won—FIPRESCI Prize
Nominated—Best Feature Film
Nominated—Best Supporting Actress (Janine Chang)

2008 Rotterdam International Film Festival
Won—Netpac Award

2008 Taipei Film Festival
Won—Best Actor (Doze Niu)
Won—Best Actress (Janine Chang)
Won—Audience Award
Nominated—Festival Grand Prize

External links

Taiwanese comedy films
2007 directorial debut films
2007 films
2007 comedy films
2000s mockumentary films
Films set in Taiwan
Films shot in Taiwan
Films directed by Doze Niu